Gim Jinseong may refer to:

Kim Jin-sung (born 1985), South Korean baseball player
Kim Jin-seong (born 2001), South Korean actor